Grotea may refer to:

 Grotea (wasp), a genus of wasps in the family Ichneumonidae
 Grotea, a genus of butterflies in the family Sesiidae; synonym of Podosesia
 Grotea, a genus of reptiles in the family Colubridae; synonym of ?
 Grotea, a genus of butterflies in the family Erebidae; synonym of Sebastia
 Grotea (plant), see 2013 in paleobotany